Anind Dey is a computer scientist. He is the Dean of the University of Washington Information School. Dey is formerly the director of the Human-Computer Interaction Institute at Carnegie Mellon University. His research interests lie at the intersection of human–computer interaction and ubiquitous computing, focusing on how to make novel technologies more usable and useful. In particular, he builds tools that make it easier to build useful ubiquitous computing applications and supporting end users in controlling their ubiquitous computing systems.

Career
Dey was born in Canada and now resides in Seattle, Washington. Dey received a Bachelor of Applied Science in computer engineering from Simon Fraser University in Burnaby, Canada in 1993. He received a Master of Science in aerospace engineering from Georgia Tech in 1995 and then went on to complete a second master's degree and a Ph.D. in computer science, also at Georgia Tech, in 2000. For his dissertation, he researched programming support for building context-aware applications: The Context Toolkit. He was a member of the Future Computing Environments research group in the College of Computing at Georgia Tech.

Research
His research interests are feedback and control in ubiquitous computing, context-aware computing, toolkits and end-user programming environments, sensor-rich environments, information overload, ambient displays, privacy, human-computer interaction.  He is among the most prolific authors in computer science and human-computer interaction.

Ubiquitous computing 
Much of Dey's research deals with the construction and intersectional nature of ubiquitous computing. In 2002, in a research project at the University of California, Berkeley alongside Scott Lederer and Jennifer Mankoff, the team developed a conceptual model exploring the tangibility and accessibility of everyday end-user privacy in ubicomp environments. The model takes considerations from societal influences, contextual factors, and subjectivity to develop a far-reaching scope for ubicomp privacy. The model was then used to explore an interactional metaphor called situational faces, which makes the issue of privacy in ubiquitous computing environments more accessible to users. This facade presents an abstraction of advanced privacy settings to allow users to more easily establish their preferences.

Smart homes and intelligent environments 
In 2006, Dey developed a research paper alongside Min Kyung Lee, Scott Davidoff, and John Zimmerman, all of Carnegie Mellon University, exploring and evaluating the usage of home automation technology and their effects on family life. As a collaboration between the School of Design and the Human-Computer Interaction Institute, the research sought to uncover areas of human-centered design that could complement family life, thus providing insight on the potential roles a smart home could play. Following a heuristic design process, the team interviewed dual-income families in their own homes, gauging  cultural and ethnographic information, leading to the generation and experimentation of a design concept. The study concluded that such accommodations would allow families to avoid breakdowns in developed routines and improve emotional connectivity between family members and the home, while allowing parents to devote more time and attention to children.

Context awareness and self-monitoring technologies 
In 2010, Dey, alongside Dana Pavel and Vic Callaghan of the School of Computer Science and Electronic Engineering at the University of Essex, evaluated and presented a highly interfaced system for users to understand and express their own lifestyles and habits through an analysis of compiled data into a story-based representation. Initial findings of the research suggested that data generated from a user base recording a user's daily activity reveals actionable personal goals that a user can draw from to improve their lifestyle. This research, presented at the 6th International Conference on Intelligent Environments in 2010, retrieved data from a number of devices and methods, including a Garmin Forerunner fitness monitor, a heart monitor, mobile phone usage data, and Internet history. This resulted in the design of a story-based presentation of data that connected the data to reveal tendencies within a user's lifestyle.

Selected publications
Dey, A.K., Mankoff, J. Designing mediation for context-aware applications. Transactions of Computer–Human Interaction special issue on Sensor-Based Interactions.
Dey, A.K., Salber, D. Abowd, G.D. A Conceptual Framework and a Toolkit for Supporting the Rapid Prototyping of Context-Aware Applications, anchor article of a special issue on Context-Aware Computing. Human–Computer Interaction (HCI) Journal, Vol. 16 (2-4), 2001, pp. 97–166.
Dey, A.K. Understanding and Using Context. Personal and Ubiquitous Computing Journal, Vol. 5 (1), 2001, pp. 4–7.
Abowd, G.D., Dey, A.K., Brotherton, J., Orr, R.J. Context-awareness in Wearable and Ubiquitous Computing Virtual Reality Society International Journal, Vol. 3, 1999, pp. 200–211.
Dey, A.K., Abowd, G.D., Wood, A. CyberDesk: a framework for providing self-integrating context-aware services. Knowledge based systems, Vol. 11 (1), September 1998, pp. 3–13.

References

External links
 Faculty profile
 Personal website
 University of Washington Information School
 

Ubiquitous computing researchers
Human–computer interaction researchers
Georgia Tech alumni
University of Washington faculty
Living people
Human-Computer Interaction Institute faculty
1970 births